Agnaridae is a family of woodlice. They were formerly considered part of the Trachelipodidae, but were moved from that family to Porcellionidae in 1989, and then placed as a separate family in 2003.

References

Further reading
Schotte, M.; Kensley, B. F.; Shilling, S. (1995 onwards). World list of Marine, Freshwater and Terrestrial Crustacea Isopoda. National Museum of Natural History Smithsonian Institution: Washington D.C., USA
Schmalfuss, H. (2003). World catalog of terrestrial isopods (Isopoda: Oniscidea). Stuttgarter Beiträge zur Naturkunde. Serie A, 654: 1–341., available online at http://www-alt.naturkundemuseum-bw.de/stuttgart/pdf/a_pdf/A654.pdf

Woodlice
Crustacean families